The Netherlands' only commercial nuclear reactor is Borssele nuclear power plant, which became operational in 1973 and  produces 485 MW and about 4% of the country's electricity.

The older Dodewaard nuclear power plant was a test reactor that was later attached to the national grid but was closed in 1997. A 2MW research reactor is located in Delft, as part of the physics department of Delft University of Technology. This reactor is not meant for energy provision, but is used as a  neutron- and positron-source for research.

History
Researchers in the Netherlands began studying nuclear energy in the 1930s and began the construction of research reactor at Dodewaard in 1955. The researchers’ goal was to introduce nuclear power technology by 1962 and reduce the need for fossil fuels. In 1968, a test nuclear reactor was attached to the power grid. This unit was shut down in 1997.

In the 1970s, the Dutch chose a policy that required the reprocessing of all spent nuclear fuel. In 1984, the government decided to create a long-term (100 years) storage facility for all intermediate and low-level radioactive waste and research strategies for ultimate disposal. In September 2003, the Central Organization for Radioactive Waste created an interim storage facility for high-level waste.

In 1994, the Netherlands' parliament voted to phase out nuclear power after a discussion of nuclear waste management. In 1997, the power station at Dodewaard was shut down and the government planned to end Borssele's operating license in 2003. In 2003, with a new government in power, the shutdown was postponed to 2013.  In 2006, the government decided that Borssele would remain open until 2034, if it complied with the highest safety standards. The owners, Essent and Delta, would invest 500 million euros in sustainable energy, together with the government's money, which, the government claims, should have otherwise been paid to the plant's owners as compensation.
After the 2010 election, the new government was open to expanding nuclear power. Both of the companies that share ownership of Borssele are proposing to build new reactors.

In January 2012, Delta announced the postponing of any decision to start building a second nuclear power plant.

In November 2018, a majority of the Dutch parliament supported the construction of new nuclear power plants.

In November 2019, an opinion poll found that 61% of Dutch voters are in favor of the installation of new nuclear plants in the Netherlands, with a noticeable discrepancy between right- and left-wing voters.

In December 2021, the Fourth Rutte cabinet stated that it wants to prepare for the construction of two new nuclear power plants in order to reduce CO2 emissions and meet the European Union goals for tackling climate change. Part of this preparation is the launch of a feasibility study, looking at the advantages and disadvantages of the use of nuclear power to tackle climate change.

In December 2022, the Fourth Rutte cabinet designated the existing Borssele nuclear power plant site as the preferred location for two new reactors. It has also called for a feasibility study into extending the operation of the existing Borssele plant beyond 2033.

See also 
 Wim Turkenburg

References